Sunshine Cruz (born July 18, 1977) is a Filipino singer and actress. She is the part of the Cruz family of actors.

Personal life
Cruz was married to actor/director Cesar Montano in September 2000. They have three children. The couple is now separated. Her current partner is Ismael Macky Mathay IV, half-brother of Filipina actress Ara Mina.

Filmography

Television

Movies
 First Time... Like a Virgin! (1992)
 Guwapings: The First Adventure (1992) Dolores
 Shake Rattle & Roll IV (1992) Gretch (segment "Ang Guro")
 Humanda ka Mayor!: Bahala na ang Diyos (1993)
 Dino... Abangan Ang Susunod Na... (1993)
 Ano Ba 'Yan 2 (1993) Carolina
 Aguinaldo (1993)
 Galvez: Hanggang sa Dulo ng Mundo Hahanapin Kita (1993)
 Pandoy: Alalay ng Panday (1993) Vibora
 Teenage Mama (1993)
 Junior Police (1994)
 Baby Paterno: Dugong Pulis (1994)
 The Marita Gonzaga Rape-Slay: In God We Trust! (1995) Marita Gonzaga
 Oha! Ako Pa?! (1995)
 Kahit Harangan ng Bala (1995) Jojo
 Costales (1995) Minda Costales
 Wilson Sorronda: Leader Kuratong Baleleng's Solid Group (1995)
 Virgin People 2 (1996)
 Sa Bingit ng Kamatayan (1996) Susan
 Medrano (1996) Lyka
 Ang Titser Kong Pogi (1996) Cynthia
 Adan Lazaro (1996) Rowena Reyes
 Paano Kung Wala Ka Na? (1997)
 Lihim ni Madonna (1997) Madonna
 Enteng en Mokong: Kaming Mga Mababaw ang Kaligayahan (1997)
 Babangon Ang Huling Patak ng Dugo (1997) Alieta
 Ang Pinakamahabang Baba sa Balat ng Lupa (1997)
 Magagandang Hayop (1998) Rowena
 Ama Namin (1998)
 Init ng Laman (1998)
 Ang Kabit ni Mrs. Montero (1999) Annie Sugay
 Ibibigay Ko ang Lahat (1999) Lucy
 Bullet (1999) Mabel
 Ekis: Walang Tatakas (1999) Dolor
 Pag Oras Mo, Oras Mo Na (2000)
 Alas-Dose (2001) May Vergara Atty. Montero
 Sunshine (2002)
 Inang Yaya (2006) May
 Ligalig (2006) Trixie
 Biktima (2012) Jane
 Just The Way You Are (2015)
 Mang Kepweng Returns (2017)
 Mystified (iflix original movie) (2019) Hellga
 The Heiress (2019) Carmen
 An Affair To Forget (Vivamax original movie) (2022) Rowena Ramos

References

External links
 

1977 births
Living people
Sunshine
Filipino child actresses
Filipino people of Spanish descent
Filipino film actresses
That's Entertainment Wednesday Group Members
That's Entertainment (Philippine TV series)
Filipino television actresses
GMA Network personalities
ABS-CBN personalities